Barata Ribeiro, 716 is a 2016 Brazilian film directed by Domingos de Oliveira and starring Sophie Charlotte and Caio Blat. It won the best film award at the 44th Gramado Film Festival.

Plot 
In 1960s Rio de Janeiro, aspiring writer Felipe leads a life of wild parties held in an apartment in the famous Barata Ribeiro street in Copacabana. There he and his friends enjoy freedom even in the midst of a complicated political moment.

Cast 
Sophie Charlotte as Gilda
Caio Blat as Felipe
Gabriel Antunes		
Álamo Facó
Maria Ribeiro
Glauce Guima
Matheus Souza
Pedro Cardoso
Sergio Guizé
Aleta Valente
Lívia de Bueno
Daniel Dantas

References

External links 
 Barata Ribeiro, 716 (in English) in the Internet Movie Database
 Barata Ribeiro, 716 (in Portuguese) in the AdoroCinema

Brazilian drama films
Brazilian independent films
2016 films
2010s Portuguese-language films